The Hawkshaw Bridge is a cable-stayed suspension bridge crossing the Saint John River near Nackawic, New Brunswick, Canada.

Built in 1967, the bridge has a main span of 217 m (713 ft).

See also 
 List of bridges in Canada

References

Road bridges in New Brunswick
Transport in York County, New Brunswick
Buildings and structures in York County, New Brunswick
Bridges over the Saint John River (Bay of Fundy)
Bridges completed in 1967
Cable-stayed bridges in Canada